Eudocima procus is a moth of the family Erebidae described by Pieter Cramer in 1777.

Distribution
This species should be present in Suriname, Colombia, Peru, Brazil and Paraguay.

References

External links
 Flickr
 Borboletas e mariposas
 Biofaces

Eudocima
Moths described in 1777